Chris Barrett (born 24 March 1973) is a former Australian rules footballer who played for Fitzroy in the Australian Football League (AFL) in 1992. He was recruited from the Torquay Football Club in the Bellarine Football League (BFL). Barrett also played with West Adelaide and Port Adelaide.

References

External links

Living people
1973 births
Fitzroy Football Club players
Australian rules footballers from Victoria (Australia)